The 1993 Mississippi State Bulldogs football team represented Mississippi State University during the 1993 NCAA Division I-A football season. The team's head coach was Jackie Sherrill. The Bulldogs played their home games in 1993 at Scott Field in Starkville, Mississippi. The NCAA later adjusted the Bulldogs' record to 4–5–2 after making Alabama forfeit 8 games in the 1993 season.

Schedule

Roster

References

Mississippi State
Mississippi State Bulldogs football seasons
Mississippi State Bulldogs football